Carabus marietti hroni is a subspecies of ground beetle in the Carabinae subfamily that is endemic to Turkey.

References

marietti hroni
Beetles described in 1997
Endemic fauna of Turkey